Jessica Shortall is a strategy consultant, social entrepreneur, LGBTQ rights advocate, and the author of Work, Pump, Repeat: The New Mom's Survival Guide to Breastfeeding and Going Back to Work. In October 2015, she gave a TED talk, "The American Case for Paid Maternity Leave" at TEDxSMU. As of November 2019, the talk had approximately 1.5 million views.

Early life and education 
In 1999, as a student at Wake Forest University, Shortall co-founded a student organization called Homerun that helped to engage students in cooking and delivering dinners to members of the community. Ultimately, the concept was merged with DC Central Kitchen, a local community kitchen model, to form The Campus Kitchens Project.

Shortall served as a Peace Corps volunteer in Uzbekistan.

In 2006, Jessica received an MBA with honors from Saïd Business School at the University of Oxford, as a Skoll Scholar in Social Entrepreneurship.

Career 
Jessica Shortall is currently Managing Director of Texas Competes, a statewide coalition of businesses, chambers of commerce, and industry associations making the economic case for an LGBTQ-welcoming Texas. She also leads America Competes, a national business coalition, along the same lines of Freedom For All Americans. She previously served as the first Director of Giving at TOMS Shoes, and as a co-founder of The Campus Kitchens Project.

References

External links 
 Link to Jessica Shortall TED Talk, "The US needs paid family leave--for the sake of its future." http://www.ted.com/talks/jessica_shortall_how_america_fails_new_parents_and_their_babies#t-16684
 Link to Texas Competes: www.texascompetes.org

Living people
Wake Forest University alumni
Year of birth missing (living people)
Alumni of Saïd Business School
Peace Corps volunteers
American social entrepreneurs